Kenneth Dawson Evans (7 November 1915 – 29 June 2007) was the second suffragan bishop of Dorking in Guildford, Surrey, England.

Evans was educated at Dulwich College and Clare College, Cambridge. Ordained in 1938, he began his career with a curacy at St Mary Northampton and was then rector of Ockley before beginning a long ecclesiastical association with the Dorking area. From 1949, he was initially vicar, then archdeacon before ascending to the Episcopate – a post he held from 1968 until 1986. In retirement, he continued to minister as an assistant bishop within the Guildford Diocese.

References

1915 births
People educated at Dulwich College
Alumni of Clare College, Cambridge
Bishops of Dorking
Archdeacons of Dorking
20th-century Church of England bishops
2007 deaths